Susie Boyt (born January 1969) is a British novelist.

Boyt is the daughter of Suzy Boyt and artist Lucian Freud and great-granddaughter of Sigmund Freud. Boyt was educated at Channing and at Camden School for Girls and read English at St Catherine's College, Oxford, graduating in 1992. As a student her boyfriend died in a climbing accident. She later trained as a bereavement counsellor.

Working variously at a PR agency, and a literary agency, she completed her first novel, The Normal Man, which was published in 1995 by Weidenfeld & Nicolson. She returned to university to do a Masters in Anglo American Literary Relations at University College London studying the works of Henry James and the poet John Berryman.

To date, she has published seven novels, the most recent being Loved and Missed (2021). In 2008, she published My Judy Garland Life, a layering of biography, hero-worship and  self-help. Her journalism includes a column in the weekend Life & Arts  section of the Financial Times. She is married to Tom Astor, a film producer. They live with their two daughters in London.

Novels
 The Normal Man, 1995
 The Characters of Love, 1996 
 The Last Hope of Girls, 2001
 Only Human, 2004
 The Small Hours, 2012
 Love & Fame, 2017
 Loved and Missed, 2021

Non-fiction
 My Judy Garland Life, 2008

Awards and nominations
  The Last Hope of Girls was shortlisted for the John Llewellyn Rhys Prize
 Only Human has been shortlisted for the Mind Book of the Year Award

See also
 Freud family

References

Living people
1969 births
British people of German-Jewish descent
Susie
People educated at Camden School for Girls
Alumni of St Catherine's College, Oxford
Alumni of University College London
Writers from London
20th-century British women writers
21st-century British women writers
British women novelists
20th-century English novelists
21st-century English novelists